Zebra is the American medical slang for arriving at a surprising, often exotic, medical diagnosis when a more commonplace explanation is more likely.  It is shorthand for the aphorism coined in the late 1940s by Theodore Woodward, professor at the University of Maryland School of Medicine, who instructed his medical interns: "When you hear hoofbeats behind you, don't expect to see a zebra." (Since zebras are much rarer than horses in the United States, the sound of hoofbeats would almost certainly be from a horse.) By 1960, the aphorism was widely known in medical circles.

Medical novices are predisposed to make rare diagnoses because of (a) the availability heuristic ("events more easily remembered are judged more probable") and (b) the phenomenon first enunciated in Rhetorica ad Herennium (circa 85 BC), "the striking and the novel stay longer in the mind."  Thus, the aphorism is an important caution against these biases when teaching medical students to weigh medical evidence. 

Diagnosticians have noted, however, that "zebra"-type diagnoses must nonetheless be held in mind until the evidence conclusively rules them out:

Comparable slang for an obscure and rare diagnosis in medicine is fascinoma.

Examples
Necrotic skin lesions in the United States are often diagnosed as loxoscelism (recluse spider bites), even in areas where Loxosceles species are rare or not present.  This is a matter of concern because such misdiagnoses can delay correct diagnosis and treatment.

Usage
Ehlers-Danlos syndrome is considered a rare condition and its sufferers are known as medical zebras. The zebra was adopted across the world as the EDS mascot to bring the patient community together and raise awareness.

Other medical aphorisms
 Sutton's law – perform first the diagnostic test expected to be most useful
 Occam's razor – select from among competing hypotheses the one that makes the fewest new assumptions
 Leonard's law of physical findings – it's obvious or it's not there
 Hickam's dictum – "Patients can have as many diseases as they damn well please"

See also
Samuel Gee — author of Medical lectures and aphorisms (1902)
James Alexander Lindsay — author of Medical axioms, aphorisms, and clinical memoranda (1924)
Maimonides — Commentary on the aphorisms of Hippocrates and medical aphorisms of Moses (12th century)

References

Bibliography

External links
Zebra Cards

Medical terminology
Medical slang
Razors (philosophy)
Metaphors referring to animals
Philosophy of medicine